Paythorne is a civil parish in Ribble Valley, Lancashire, England.  It contains twelve listed buildings that are recorded in the National Heritage List for England.  Of these, one is at Grade II*, the middle grade, and the others are at Grade II, the lowest grade. The parish contains the village of Paythorne, and is otherwise rural.  Most of the listed buildings are houses, farmhouses, and farm buildings.  The other listed buildings include two bridges, a church, a boundary stone, and a shelter for horses.

Key

Buildings

References

Citations

Sources

Lists of listed buildings in Lancashire
Buildings and structures in Ribble Valley